Ray Beckett may refer to:

 Ray Beckett (journalist) (1903–1983), Australian journalist
 Ray Beckett (sound engineer), British sound engineer